Larry O'Connor (born May 4, 1956) is a politician in Ontario, Canada. He was the mayor of the township of Brock, Ontario from 2006 to 2011. He was also a New Democratic Party member of the Legislative Assembly of Ontario from 1990 to 1995.

Background
O'Connor was born in Oshawa, Ontario. He worked at General Motors plant as an assembly worker. He was a member of the political action committee of the Canadian Auto Workers Local 222 in Oshawa. He is married to Christina with whom he has one son.

Politics

Provincial, 1990–1995
O'Connor ran as the New Democratic Party candidate in the 1990 provincial election in the riding of Durham—York. He wasn't nominated until two weeks after the start of the election. During the campaign he said the major issues were lack of approvals for expanding schools and rising property taxes. He defeated Liberal incumbent Bill Ballinger by 1,230 votes. After the election he promised to clean up pollution in Lake Simcoe and Musselman Lake. He was appointed as Parliamentary assistant to the Minister of the Environment, Ruth Grier.

In 1991, he argued against a proposal to create a garbage dump in the Durham region. He suggested that York region was the only viable option. Later in the year, he defended the NDP's legislation called the Waste Management Act saying that it was a reasonable compromise to handle the problem of finding a place for Toronto's garbage.

The NDP were defeated in the 1995 provincial election, having lost much of their support base in the Greater Toronto Area. O'Connor finished second in his re-election bid, with 8,048 votes, almost 17,000 votes behind Progressive Conservative Julia Munro.

He planned to run for the federal New Democratic Party in Oshawa in the 2004 federal election, but lost the NDP nomination to Sid Ryan.

In 2002–03, O'Connor supported Bill Blaikie for the leadership of the federal NDP.

Electoral record

Durham municipal, 2006-2011
O'Connor was elected as a Durham regional councillor in 1997, later becoming chair of the region's Health and Social Services committee and president of the Association of Public Health Agencies (alPHa) in the Durham region.

O'Connor was first elected mayor of Brock Township in the 2006 municipal elections. He was re-elected in the 2010 municipal elections, but his 13-vote margin of victory over former mayor Terry Clayton led to a recount battle. The township used a mail-in voting system in 2010, and when ballots which were postmarked before election day but arrived late were counted, O'Connor's margin of victory was reduced to just three votes. O'Connor voluntarily resigned as mayor on March 28, 2011, and the township council subsequently appointed Clayton as the new mayor.

Federal, 2012
Following the resignation of Bev Oda, the riding of Durham became vacant as of July 31, 2012. On October 23, O'Connor was selected as the federal New Democratic Party candidate in the resulting by-election to be held on November 26.

References

External links
 

1956 births
Living people
Ontario New Democratic Party MPPs
Canadian people of Irish descent
Mayors of places in Ontario
Canadian Auto Workers people
People from Oshawa
Trade unionists from Ontario
Canadian Métis people
New Democratic Party candidates for the Canadian House of Commons